Mutinus is a genus of fungi in the family Phallaceae. The genus was first described by Elias Magnus Fries in 1849. According to the Dictionary of the Fungi (10th edition, 2008), the widespread genus contains 12 species.

Species

Etymology
The genus name Mutinus was a phallic deity, Mutunus, one of the Roman di indigetes placated by Roman brides.

References

External links

Phallales
Agaricomycetes genera